Joaquín Carlos Giudice Ghío (3 June 1906 – 12 October 1979), known as Carlos Giudice, was a Chilean footballer.

Career
He is one of the greatest players in Audax Italiano history.

At international level, he made 3 appearances for the Chile national team and scored one goal in the 1935 South American Championship. At the championship, he performed as the team captain as well as the deputy director of Chilean delegation and the team coach alongside Joaquín Morales, the head director of the delegation.

Honours

Club
Audax Italiano
 Campeonato Nacional (Chile): 1936

Individual
 Campeonato Nacional (Chile) Top-Scorer: 1934

References

External links
 Carlos Giudice at PartidosdeLaRoja 
 

1906 births
1979 deaths
Chilean people of Italian descent
People from Marga Marga Province
Chilean footballers
Chilean expatriate footballers
Chile international footballers
Santiago Wanderers footballers
Peñarol players
Audax Italiano footballers
Chilean Primera División players
Uruguayan Primera División players
Chilean expatriate sportspeople in Uruguay
Expatriate footballers in Uruguay
Association football forwards
Chilean football managers
Chile national football team managers